Lobocheilos kajanensis is a species of cyprinid in the genus Lobocheilos.

References

Cyprinidae
Cyprinid fish of Asia
Fish of Indonesia
Taxa named by Canna Maria Louise Popta